The Danedyke Mystery is a 1979 British mystery television series which originally aired on ITV in 1979. A former police detective turned Anglican priest investigates strange goings on in the village of Danedyke St Mary.

Cast
 Michael Craig as  Rev. Septimus Treloar
 Kenneth Colley as  The Major
 Tessa Peake-Jones as  Angela Horton
 John Rhys-Davies as  Armchair
 Derek Thompson as Tom Richards
 Adrian Delaney as Russell Skingle
 Preston Lockwood as  Dr. Henry Simmonds 
 Peter Vaughan as Det. Insp. Burroughs
 Jeremy Child as  Mary Crowle
 Leon Eagles as Olov Hellerstadt 
 Bernard Latham as  PC Skingle
 Robert Longden as Lionel Empson
 Simon Molloy as Det. Sgt. Trasker
 Lee Atkins as  Choir boy
 Candace Hartley as  Jenny
 Valerie Shute as  Policewoman
 William Tarmey as Workman
 Teddy Turner as  Warner Baxendale
 David Sumner as  Narrator

References

Bibliography
 Mark J. Docherty & Alistair D. McGown. The Hill and Beyond: Children's Television Drama - An Encyclopedia. Bloomsbury Academic, 2003.

External links
 

1979 British television series debuts
1979 British television series endings
1970s British drama television series
1970s British mystery television series
1970s British television miniseries
English-language television shows
ITV television dramas
Television series by ITV Studios
Television shows produced by Granada Television